The Slovak people are an ethnic group mostly inhabiting the modern-day nation of Slovakia, as well as near surrounding areas. Slovaks have played an active role in European history, including politically, militarily, scientifically, culturally, and religiously. Ethnic Slovaks have inhabited Central Europe since the Middle Ages. Slovaks were minority citizens of Hungary, and subsequently Austria-Hungary, from the 7th Century until the formation of Czechoslovakia in 1918 by the Treaty of Versailles. After Slovak calls for greater autonomy dissolved the Czechoslovak parliament, the Slovak Republic was formed in 1993. The major language among Slovaks is Slovak.

The page lists notable people who are citizens of Slovakia, Czechoslovakia, or are of Slovak identity, ancestry or ethnicity.

Politics

Politicians (contemporary)

Prime Ministers of the Slovak Republic:
Vladimír Mečiar (1942) – First and Third Prime Minister
Jozef Moravčík (1945) – Second Prime Minister
Mikuláš Dzurinda (1955) – Fourth Prime Minister
Robert Fico (1964) – Fifth and Seventh Prime Minister
Iveta Radičová (1956) – Sixth and First Female Prime Minister
Peter Pellegrini (1975) – Eighth Prime Minister
Igor Matovič (1973) – Ninth Prime Minister
Eduard Heger (1976) - Tenth Prime Minister
Presidents:

Michal Kováč (1930–2016) – First President
Rudolf Schuster (1934) – Second President (Schuster is of German and Hungarian ancestry.)
Ivan Gašparovič (1941) – Third President (Previously Chairman of the National Council of the Slovak Republic)
Andrej Kiska (1963) – Fourth President (Co-founder of a non-profit charitable organization called Dobrý anjel.)
Zuzana Čaputová (1973) – Fifth President and First Female President

Speakers of National Council of the Slovak Republic:

 Pavol Hrušovský (1952) – Third and Sixth Speaker of Parliament
 Richard Sulík (1968) – Fifth Speaker of Parliament

Other:

 Jesse Ventura (1951) – 38th Governor of the U.S. state of Minnesota from 1999 to 2003, as well as an actor, author, and former professional wrestler. His parents were from Slovakia, and his legal name is James George Janos.

Politicians (19th and 20th century)

Alexander Dubček (1921–1992) – First Secretary of the Communist Party of Czechoslovakia and architect of the Prague Spring, later after Velvet Rovolution Chairman of Federal Assembly of Czechoslovakia
Tomáš Garrigue Masaryk (1850–1937) – First President of Czechoslovakia; son of a Slovak father and Moravian mother
Milan Rastislav Štefánik (1880–1919) – Astronomer, scientist, politician, and general; one of the founders of Czechoslovakia
Gustáv Husák (1913–1991) –First Secretary of the Communist Party of Czechoslovakia and President of Czechoslovakia in the 1970s and 1980s
Štefan Marko Daxner (1822–1892) – Slovak lower nobleman of Swiss descent, politician, lawyer, and poet who of outlined a program unifying the requests for national (Slovak), cultural, political and social liberties
Andrej Hlinka (1864–1938) – Priest and founders of the Slovak People's Party
Milan Hodža (1878–1944) – Prime Minister of Czechoslovakia, politician and journalist
Fedor Hodža (1912–1968) – Politician and lawyer; the son of Milan Hodža.
Vojtech Tuka (1880–1946) – Slovak People's Party politician, teacher
Alexander Mach (1902–1980) – Slovak People's Party politician, journalist
Martin Rázus (1888–1937) – Politician, priest
Vavro Šrobár (1867-1950) - was a Slovak doctor and politician who was a major figure in Slovak politics in the interwar period. 
Jan Šverma (1903–1944) – Partisan and communist politician
Jozef Miloslav Hurban (1817–1886) – priest, politician and Speaker of Slovak National Council
Michal Miloslav Hodža (1811–1870) – one of the leaders of a Slovak national movement and member of Slovak National Council, Lutheran priest, poet, linguist
Vladimír Clementis (1902–1952) – Communist politician
Ľudovít Štúr (1815–1856) – the leader of Slovak national movement, the creator of standard Slovak, politician, poet, journalist, publisher, teacher, philosopher and member of the Hungarian Parliament

Fighters, Warriors, Soldiers and Revolutionaries
Jozef Gabčík (1912–1942) – soldier who assassinated Reinhard Heydrich, architect of the Holocaust, under Operation Anthropoid.
Jozef Miloslav Hurban (1817–1886) – freedom fighter and leader of the 1848 Slovak National Uprising against the Hungarians.
Rudolf Viest (1890–1945?) – Anti-Fascist military leader, member of the Czechoslovak government in exile, member of the Slovak National Council and the commander of the 1st Czechoslovak army during the Slovak National Uprising. First and only Slovak to reach the position of General in the interwar Czechoslovak Army. 
Ján Golian (1906–1945?) – Supreme Military Leader of the Slovak National Uprising against the Nazis. Golian was murdered by the Nazis in a concentration camp.
Michael Strank – U.S. Marine during World War II; the leader of the group of U.S. marines who photographed in Raising the Flag on Iwo Jima.
Augustín Malár (1894–1946) – WWII General who commanded the East Slovak units of the First Slovak Republic, a Nazi protectorate state. Died in a concentration camp.
Jozef Turanec (1892–1957) – Slovak General and Nazi sympathizer during World War II.
Matej Kocak (1882–1918) – United States Marine Corps sergeant during World War I, posthumously awarded both the U.S. Army and Navy Medals of Honor for action against the enemy on July 18, 1918. He was born in the town of Gbely, in Western Slovakia, and emigrated to the U.S. in 1906.

First Ladies
Livia Klausová – first lady of the Czech Republic
Silvia Gašparovičová – first lady of Slovakia

Religion

Notable religious figures
Blessed Pavol Peter Gojdič (Pavol Gojdič) (1888–1960) – martyr and Righteous among the nations
Zdenka Schelingová (1916–1955)
Basil Hopko (1904–1976)
Andrej Hlinka (1864-1938)

Religious Leaders
Štefan Moyses (1797–1869) – Bishop, patriot and the first president of the Matica Slovenská, the first Slovak cultural institution.
Jozef Roháček (1877–1962) – Protestant activist and scholar who translated the first Slovak Bible from the original languages
Alexander Rudnay (1760–1831)(hung.: Rudnay Sándor) – Parish priest who became Archbishop of Esztergom, Prince Primate of the Kingdom of Hungary and a Cardinal.
Ján Sokol (1933) – Priest and former archbishop of the Archdiocese of Trnava
Juraj Haulik (1788–1869) – Croatian Cardinal of Slovak ethnicity and the first archbishop of Zagrab. Acting Ban of Croatia for two separate terms.
Jozef Tomko (1924) – Cardinal of the Roman Catholic Church and former Prefect of the Congregation for the Evangelization of Peoples
Róbert Bezák (1960) – former Archbishop of Trnava

Science and technology

Philosophers, Polyhistors, Teachers

Pavol Jozef Šafárik (Paul Joseph Schaffarik, Pavel Josef Safarik) (1795–1861) – poet, professor, polyhistor
Jakob Jakobeus (1591–1645) – poet, historian, priest, and writer

Linguists, Humanists and Historians
Anton Bernolák (1762–1813) – Lower nobleman, Jesuit, creator of the first standard version of Slovak (in the 1780s), which was based on western Slovak dialects.
Ľudovít Štúr (Ludevít Štúr) (1815–1856) – Best known for his role in the development of modern Slovak. In 1844 he suggested that the central Slovak dialect be used as the standard language of the Slovaks, and in 1846 he codified the new language standard in his Nauka reči Slovenskej (Theory of the Slovak Language)
Adam František Kollár (Adam Franz Kollar) (1718–1783) – Lower nobleman, historian and jurist who rose to the ranks of Imperial-Royal Court Councilor and Chief Imperial-Royal Librarian of Empress Maria Theresa. Coined the term ethnology.
Janko Matúška (1821–1877) – author of the Slovak national anthem
Martin Hattala (1821–1903) – linguist

Inventors and Engineers
Jozef Murgaš (1864–1929) – inventor of the wireless telegraph (forerunner of the radio), and holder of other patents include the spinning reel (for fishing), the wave meter, the electric transformer, the magnetic detector, and an engine producing electromagnetic waves.
Aurel Stodola (1859–1942) – engineer and professor, enabled the construction of steam and gas turbines (around 1900), constructor of a movable artificial arm (the Stodola arm) in 1915
John Dopyera (Ján Dopjera) (1893–1988) – inventor of music instruments, invented the Dobro resonator guitar

Aviation
Ján Bahýľ (1865–1916) – military engineer, inventor of a motor-driven helicopter (four years before Bréguet and Cornu). Bahýľ was granted 7 patents in all, including the invention of the tank pump, air balloons combined with an air turbine, the first petrol engine car in Slovakia (with Anton Marschall) and a lift up to Bratislava castle.
Štefan Banič (1870–1941) – inventor of the military parachute and of the first actively used parachute
Ivan Alexander Getting (1912–2003) – American physicist and electrical engineer, credited (along with Bradford Parkinson) with the development of the Global Positioning System (GPS).

Natural Sciences and Medicine
Vojtech Alexander (1857–1916) – revolutionary radiologist
Daniel Carleton Gajdusek (1923–2008) – American physician and Nobel Prize winner of Slovak descent
Andreas Jaszlinszky (18th century) – Jesuit physics professor
Ján Jesenský (Johann Jessenius) (1566–1621) – physician, surgeon, anatomist,  rector of Charles University, Protestant activist and politician
Ján Vilček (1933) – biomedical scientist, educator, inventor and philanthropist

Geology, Mineralogy
Dimitrij Andrusov (1897–1976) – geologist and paleontologist, founder of modern Slovak geology
Jan Veizer (1941) – geochemist and paleoclimatologist

Archeology
Andrej Kmeť (1841–1908) – botanist, archaeologist
Ján Kollár – pastor, writer, archaeologist, academic

Physics
Dionýz Ilkovič (1907–1980) – physicist
Stefan Janos (1943) – low temperature physicist living in Switzerland
Joseph Klafter (1945) – Israeli chemical physics professor of Slovak descent; the eighth President of Tel Aviv University 
Ivan Wilhelm :cs:Ivan Wilhelm (1942) – nuclear physicist, former rector of Charles University in Prague

Mathematics
Jur Hronec – mathematician
Igor Kluvánek – mathematician
Samuel Mikovíny – Hungarian mathematician, engineer and map maker
Tibor Šalát – mathematician, author of many mathematical textbooks in Slovak
Peter Štefan – mathematician
Štefan Znám – mathematician

Computer Science
Juraj Hromkovič – Slovak computer scientist living in Switzerland

Astronomy

Matthias Bel – 17th century astronomer. He made first relatively precise measurement of distance from Earth to Sun.

Astronomers (20th century)
Milan Rastislav Štefánik
Milan Antal
Antonín Bečvář
Ladislav Brožek
Ľubor Kresák
Dušan Kalmančok
Ľudmila Pajdušáková
Vladimír Porubčan
Juraj Tóth

Astronauts / Cosmonauts 
Ivan Bella (1964) – the first cosmonaut of Slovakia (in 1998)
Eugene Cernan (1934) – U.S. astronaut, last man to set foot on the Moon, son of the Slovak immigrant Ondrej Čerňan.
Michael Fincke (1967) – U.S. astronaut, current American record holder for time in space, grandson of Margaret Hornyak Fincke

Economists
Lubos Pastor (1974) – Slovakian-American financial economist, currently the Charles P. McQuaid Professor of Finance at the University of Chicago Booth School of Business.

Culture

Literature
See list of Slovak prose and drama authors.See list of Slovak poets.

Music

Classical

Composers

Alexander Albrecht (1885–1958) – composer, conductor, teacher
Ján Levoslav Bella (1843–1936) – composer, author of the first Slovak opera "Kováč Wieland"
Juraj Beneš (1940–2004) – composer
Ján Cikker (1911–1989) – composer, teacher
Ernő Dohnányi (aka Ernst von Dohnányi) (July 27, 1877 – February 9, 1960) – Hungarian conductor, composer, and pianist.
Viliam Figuš-Bystrý (1875–1937) – composer, teacher
Tibor Frešo (1918–1987) – composer, conductor
Vladimír Godár (1956) – composer
Frico Kafenda (1883–1963) – composer, teacher, pianist, conductor
Dezider Kardoš (1914–1991) – composer, teacher
Ladislav Kupkovič (1936–2016) – composer, conductor
Peter Machajdik (1961) – composer, organizer
Ján Móry (Johann Mory) (1892–1978) – composer
Alexander Moyzes (1906–1984) – composer
Mikuláš Schneider-Trnavský (1881–1958) – composer
Eugen Suchoň (1908–1993) – the most important Slovak composer, author of the first Slovak national opera "Krútňava", teacher
Iris Szeghy (1956) – female composer

Conductors
Peter Breiner (1957) – conductor, composer, pianist
Ondrej Lenárd (1942) – conductor
Ľudovít Rajter (1906–2000) – conductor, teacher, composer
Bystrík Režucha (1935–2012) – conductor
Ladislav Slovák (1919–1999) – conductor

Instrumentalists
Peter Michalica (1945) – violinist

Opera Singers
Peter Dvorský (1951) – tenor
Edita Gruberová (1946–2021) – soprano
Jozef Kundlák (1956) – tenor
Lucia Popp (1939–1993) – soprano
Luba Orgonasova (1961) – soprano

Jazz
Peter Lipa (1943) – an important current Jazz singer, composer
Laco Deczi (1938) – Jazz musician, trumpet player, composer
Martin Valihora (1976) – Jazz musician, drummer

Popular Music (20th century)
Jaroslav Filip (1949–2000) – musician, composer, vocalist, actor, playwright
Marika Gombitová (1956) – singer, composer, musician since the second half of the 1970s
Dave Grohl (1969) – drummer of Nirvana, singer of Foo Fighters
Dara Rolins (1972) – singer, entrepreneur
Tina (1984) – singer, musician since the 2000s
Pavol Hammel (1948) – singer, composer, musician (reached his height the 1970s and 1980s)
Jana Kirschner – musician, composer, vocalist
Jana Kocianová (1947-2018) – singer, musician, jazzman, gospels singer reached her height the 1970s 
Ján Lehotský (1947) – composer, musician, singer of Modus (a band having reached its height in the late 1970s)
Rytmus (1977) – rapper, singer, actor, member and co-founder of the hip-hop group Kontrafakt, musician since the 1990s
Ivan Tásler (1979) – singer, guitarist, composer, producer, musician since the 1990s
Peter Lipa – musician, composer, vocalist, scatman, jazzman, co-organizer of BJD (Bratislava Jazz Days) festival
Laco Lučenič (1952) – musician, producer, member of Modus
Richard Müller (1961) – the best-known current Slovak pop-rock singer
Vašo Patejdl (1954) – the most important Slovak pop composer in the 1980s and 1990s, singer, musician
Jozef Ráž (1954) – current singer of Elán (a band having reached its height in the 1980s)
Dežo Ursiny (1947–1995) – composer, rock singer, musician in the 1960s and 1970s
Marián Varga (1947–2017) – rock composer, musician in the 1960s and 1970s
Miroslav Žbirka (1952–2021) – singer, composer from the 1970s to the 1990s
Sui Vesan – folk musician

Fine arts

Painters, Graphic Artists
Janko Alexy (1894–1970) – painter
Blažej Baláž (1958) – painter, graphic artist
Mária Balážová (1956) – painter, graphic artist
Miloš Alexander Bazovský (1899–1968) – painter, graphic artist
Martin Benka (1888–1971) – painter, illustrator
Albín Brunovský (1935–1997) – graphic artist, painter, illustrator
Lajos Csordák (1864–1937) – painter
Ľudovít Fulla (1902–1980) – painter, graphic artist, illustrator
Mikuláš Galanda (1895–1938) – painter, graphic artist, illustrator
Ian Hornak (1944–2002) – draughtsman, painter, printmaker
Július Jakoby (1903–1985) – painter
Ján Kupecký (Johann Kupecky) (1667–1740) – painter
Anton Lehmden (1929) – Austrian painter; born in Slovakia
Palo Macho (1965) – painter
Jozef Teodor Mousson (1887–1946) – painter
Koloman Sokol (1902–2003) – painter
Karl Sovanka (1883–1961) – painter, sculptor
Martin Vargic – graphic artist, illustrator
Andy Warhol

Sculptors

Fraňo Štefunko (1903–1974) – sculptor

Photographers
Dezo Hoffmann (1912–1986) – photoreporter and photographer
Tono Stano (1960) – photographer; his photograph Sense inspired the poster for the film Showgirls.

Architects

Bohuslav Fuchs (1895–1972) – architect; a Czech also active in Slovakia
Dušan Jurkovič (1868–1947) – architect

Film and Theatre

Actors
Andrej Bagar (1900–1966) – actor, director
Barbora Bobuľová (1974) – actress
Milan Kňažko (1945) – actor, former Slovak Deputy Prime Minister, Minister of Foreign Affairs, and Minister of Culture
Jozef Kroner (1924–1998) – actor, starred in the first Czechoslovak, Czech and Slovak film awarded by Oscar: The Shop on Main Street (Obchod na korze, 1965)
Juraj Kukura (1947) – well-known Slovak actor (theater, film), who has also been working in Germany.
Barbara Nedeljáková (1979) – actress, starred in the Hollywood horror film Hostel
Paul Newman (1925–2008) – US actor, director, entrepreneur, philanthropist, of ethnic Slovak mother
Emília Vášáryová (1942) – actress
Jon Voight (1938) – American actor with Slovak ancestry
Karol L. Zachar (1918–2003) – actor, director
Tomáš Raček (1947) – Slovak actor (theater, film, TV), who has also been working in Canada
Michael Stroka (1938–1997) –  US TV actor

Filmmakers
Paľo Bielik (1910–1983) – director, actor
Dušan Hanák (1938) – director
Juraj Herz (1934) – Slovak director and actor born in Kežmarok
Juraj Jakubisko (1938) – director (sometimes nicknamed Slovak Fellini)
Ján Kadár (1918–1979) – director
Dušan Rapoš (1953) – Slovak director
Ivan Reitman (1946) – probably the most prominent film director and producer born in Slovakia
Martin Šulík (1963) – director
Pavol Barabáš (1959) – documentarist, noted for filming people living in extreme conditions

Law
William T. Dzurilla (1953) – international attorney and law clerk to Justice Byron White of the United States Supreme Court (1982–1983).
Peter Tomka (1956) – Vice-President of the International Court of Justice

Sports
Ivan Bátory (1975) – cross-country skiing
Imre Bugár (1955) – ethnic Hungarian athlete
Karol Divín (1936) – figure-skating
Paulína Fialková (1992) - biathlete
Bohumil Golián (1931) – volleyball-player
Jozef Gönci (1974) – sport shooter
Jozef Krnáč (1977) – judo
Anastasiya Kuzmina (Anastasia Kuzminová) (1984) – Russian born biathlete
Martina Moravcová (1976) - swimmer, twice Olympic silver medalist
Ondrej Nepela (1951–1989) – figure-skating
Jozef Plachý (1949) – athlete
Jozef Pribilinec (1960) – race walker, Olympic gold medalist
Jack Quinn (1883–1946) – baseball player
Richard Réti – Austrian-Hungarian, later Czechoslovak chess grandmaster
Jozef Sabovčík – figure-skating
Peter Sagan (1990) – cyclist, 3 times UCI World Champion (2015, 2016, 2017) 
Alojz Sokol (Aloisius Szokol) (1871–1932) – athlete, pioneer of the Olympic movement in historic Hungary
Anton Tkáč (1951) – cyclist
Yvonne Tobis (born 1948) – Israeli Olympic swimmer, born in Bratislava
Július Torma (1922–1991) – boxer
Elmer Valo (1921–1998) – baseball player
Veronika Velez-Zuzulová (1984) - alpine ski racer
Petra Vlhová (1995) - alpine ski racer; World Cup winner 2021, gold on the Winter Olympics 2022
Ján Zachara (1928) – boxer
Radoslav Židek (1981) – snowboarder, first Slovak medallist from independent Slovakia at the Winter Olympics

Football
Jozef Adamec (1942–2018) – former footballer
Peter Dubovský (1972–2000) – footballer
Ľudovít Dubovský (1918-1998) - footballer 
Marek Hamšík (1987) – midfielder, currently playing for Chinese side Dalian Professional
Peter Jakubech (1971) - footballer 
Karol Jokl (1945–1996) – footballer
Peter Kostolanský (1985) - footballer
Marek Mintál (1977) – footballer
Ľubomír Moravčík (1965) – footballer
Ján Popluhár (1935) – footballer
Viliam Schrojf (1931–2007) – footballer
Martin Škrtel (1985) – footballer, currently playing for FC Spartak Trnava
Marián Timm (1990) - footballer
Jozef Vengloš (1936–2021) – football manager and former footballer, managed Aston Villa, Celtic FC (Glasgow), the Czechoslovak and the Slovak national teams, current director of FIFA's Technical Study Group.
Vladimír Weiss senior (1964) – Head coach of Slovakia national football team
Vladimír Weiss junior (1989) – winger

Ice hockey

Ľuboš Bartečko – (1976)
Igor Bobček - (1983)
Lukáš Bokroš - (1982)
Peter Bondra – (1968)
Martin Chovan - (1986)
Zdeno Cíger – (1969)
Pavol Demitra –  (1974–2011)
Vladimír Dzurilla – (1942–1995)
Marián Gáborík – (1982)
Jozef Golonka – (1938)
Jaroslav Halák – (1985)
Michal Handzuš – (1977)
Marcel Hossa – (1981)
Marián Hossa – (1979)
Zdeno Chára – (1977)
Igor Liba – (1960)
Vincent Lukáč – (1954)
Stan Mikita – (1940)
Ladislav Nagy – (1979)
Žigmund Pálffy – (1972)
Dárius Rusnák – (1959)
Jozef Stümpel – (1972)
Miroslav Šatan – (1974)
Anton Šťastný – (1959)
Marián Šťastný – (1953)
Peter Šťastný – (1956)
Róbert Švehla – (1969)
Ladislav Troják – (1914–1948)
Ľubomír Višňovský – (1976)
Ľubomír Vaškovič - (1986)

Tennis
Karol Beck (1982)
Dominika Cibulková (1989)
Karina Habšudová (1973)
Daniela Hantuchová (1983) – Slovakia's most successful female player
Dominik Hrbatý (1978)
Martin Kližan (1989)
Karol Kučera (1974)
Miloslav Mečíř (1964)
Magdaléna Rybáriková (1988)
Marián Vajda (1965) – coach of a world top tennis-player Novak Djokovic

Water sports
Juraj Bača (1977) – speed canoeing
Zuzana Čunderlíková – rafting
Jana Dukátová (1983) – water slalom
Peter and Pavol Hochschorner (1979) – water slalom
Elena Kaliská (1972) – water slalom
Slavomír Kňazovický (1967) – speed canoeing
Michal Martikán (1979) – water slalom, Olympic gold medalist, Atlanta 1996, Beijing 2008
Juraj Minčík (1977) – water slalom
Martina Moravcová (1976) – swimmer
Michal Riszdorfer (1977) – speed canoeing
Richard Riszdorfer (1981) – speed canoeing
Erik Vlček (1981) – speed canoeing

Figure Skating
Karol Divín (1936)
Ondrej Nepela (1951–1989)
Jozef Sabovčík (1963)

Modelsports
Jozef Gábriš (Joseph Gabris) – born in Bratislava. Most popular and successful Control Line aerobatics pilot (F2B) of former Czechoslovakia.

Other

Historical personalities
Móric Beňovský (1746–1786) – Hungarian globetrotter, explorer, soldier, writer, and the King of Madagascar with Slovak ancestry.
Juraj Jánošík (1688–1713) – the Slovak equivalent of Robin Hood, the topic of many Slovak legends, books and films
Matúš Čák Trenčianský (1260-1321) Oligarch of Upper Hungary known as Lord of the Váh and Tatras, he is considered a Folk hero by some Slovaks for not accepting foreign kings as rulers of the Kingdom of Hungary.
Štefan Parmenius Štítnický (1555-1583) - Hungarian Navigator and chronicler of Slovak origin, member of Humphrey Gilbert's expedition.
Ádam Jávorka (1663-1747) Kuruc insurgent of Slovak ethnicity later became General of the Polish hussars
Juraj Šucha (1504-1550) Hungarian soldier of Slovak ethnicity fought against the Turkish invaders
Pribina (9th century) first Slavic prince

Models
Kamila Filipcikova – High Fashion Slovak Model
Viera Schottertova – model
Adriana Sklenaříková – model, face of "Wonderbra" adverts
Michaela Hlaváčková

Miscellaneous

 Shlomo Breznitz (born 1936) - Israeli author, psychologist, and president of the University of Haifa
Ľudovít Lačný (1926-2019) – chess composer, FIDE master
Sándor Petőfi (1823–1849) – Hungarian national poet, born to a Slovak mother
Rudolf Vrba (1924–2006) – Auschwitz survivor, author of the Vrba-Wetzler report
Miriam Roth (1910–2005), Israeli writer and scholar of children's books, kindergarten teacher, and educator
Vladimír Valach (1937-2006), diplomat and banker

See also
 List of people by nationality
 List of Slovak Americans
 Slovak Americans

References